Salón de la fama ("Hall of Fame") is the first remix album by American singer Nicky Jam. It is an album of his greatest hit songs as well as several new tracks.

Track listing

Charts

References

2003 albums
Nicky Jam albums
Albums produced by Rafy Mercenario